Twice discography may refer to:

 Twice albums discography
 Twice singles discography
 List of songs recorded by Twice

Twice (group)